Bartholomew Brome, Brown or Browne (fl. 1589) was an English politician.

He was the son of Robert Brome. He was active in the local politics of Canterbury, Kent, being made a Freeman of the city in 1563, a common councilman in 1564, Sheriff of Canterbury for 1572–73 and 1575–76, an alderman in 1584 and mayor for 1589–90.

Brome was a Member of Parliament (MP) for Canterbury in 1589.

He married twice; firstly Anne, with whom he had at least 1 daughter and secondly Anne Parker.

References

People from Canterbury
English MPs 1589
Politics of Kent
Sheriffs of Canterbury
Mayors of Canterbury